Gimnasio Alessandro Volta is a private Italian international school in Usaquén, Bogotá, Colombia. It has scuola infanzia (preschool) through secondaria II grado (upper secondary school).

References

External links

 Gimnasio Alessandro Volta 

International schools in Bogotá
Italian international schools in Colombia